Khmelnytsky or Khmelnitsky may refer to:

People 

 Bohdan Khmelnytsky - a Cossack leader who led a namesake 1648-1657 uprising in Ukraine
 Khmelnytskyi (surname) - a surname of Ukrainian origin

Geographic names 

 Khmelnytskyi, Ukraine – the administrative center of Khmelnytskyi Oblast, formerly Proskuriv (Proskurov)
 Khmelnytskyi Oblast – an oblast (province) of Ukraine
 Khmelnytskyi Raion – a raion (district) of Khmelnytskyi Oblast of Ukraine
 Pereiaslav-Khmelnytskyi Raion – a raion of Kyiv Oblast of Ukraine

Ship names 

 Khmelnytsky - a corvette of the Tarantul-class corvette commissioned in 1985 initially for the Soviet Navy
 Hetman Bohdan Khmelnytsky - name of the cruiser Chervona Ukraina in 1918-1922

Others 

 Khmelnytsky Uprising, the 1648-1657 Cossack uprising led by Bohdan Khmelnytsky 
 Khmelnytskyi Nuclear Power Plant, a Ukrainian power plant.

See also 

 Chmielnik (disambiguation)